This is an enumeration of notable people affiliated with Kean University of New Jersey.

Alumni

Education
 Grace Baxter Fenderson, taught in Newark City Schools for 42 years; co-founded Newark chapter of NAACP in 1914
 Roseann Quinn (1966), schoolteacher whose 1973 murder was the basis for Judith Rossner's 1975 novel Looking for Mr. Goodbar and its derivative 1977 film.
 Robert Van Houten, president of the New Jersey Institute of Technology from 1947-1970

Entertainment 

 Adam Glyn, reporter on TMZ

Government and politics 

 León Febres Cordero, President of Ecuador  (1984–1988)
 Steve Adubato, Sr., Democratic politician; Kean honorary doctorate recipient
 Edward J. Patten (Class of 1927), member of the United States House of Representatives from New Jersey's 15th Congressional district (1963–1981); former New Jersey Secretary of State (1954–1962)
 Nellie Pou, New Jersey Assemblywoman (1997–present); Assistant Minority Leader (2000–2001); Deputy Speaker of the New Jersey General Assembly (2002–2005)
 Nicholas Scutari, New Jersey Senator (2004–present)
 James F. Sloan, Assistant Commandant for Intelligence and Criminal Investigations; head of intelligence for the United States Coast Guard (2003–2009)
 Joseph Suliga, New Jersey Assemblyman (1994–2001); New Jersey Senator (2001–2004)
 Oadline Truitt, New Jersey Assemblywoman (2006–2008)

Music and art 

 Richie Sambora, singer

Sports 
 Crowbar (born Devon Storm), professional wrestler; graduated with a degree in Physical Therapy
 Petter Villegas, soccer winger; made his name with the MetroStars of Major League Soccer

TV, radio, and film 

 Joe Bevilacqua (1982), actor, writer, producer, broadcaster, 2013 Kean Distinguished Alumni Award Recipient
 Chris Cimino, TV meteorologist
 Christine E. Dickson, cognitive psychologist
Al Dukes, radio producer and personality, Executive Producer of Boomer and Gio on WFAN
 Linda Morris (1969), Emmy Award-winning writer and producer of Frasier
 Ed Naha, writer of science fiction novels and the motion picture screenplay for Honey, I Shrunk the Kids
 Roseann Quinn (1966), schoolteacher, literary and television character
 Vic Rauseo (1969), Emmy Award-winning writer and producer of Frasier
 Holly Taylor, actor, The Americans
 Bruce Williams, businessman; radio talk show host; host of The Bruce Williams Show<ref>Eftimiades, Maria. "Radio Personality Without Limits", The New York Times, July 2, 1989. Retrieved February 20, 2008.</ref>

Faculty
McKinley Boston, director of athletics at Kean College, 1986–1987; athletics director at University of Rhode Island, 1988–1990; athletics director at University of Minnesota, 1991–1995; vice president for student development and athletics at University of Minnesota, 1995–2000; athletics director at New Mexico State University, 2004–present
Frank J. Esposito, historian; Distinguished Service Professor of History at Kean; 2009 candidate for Lieutenant Governor of New Jersey with independent candidate Christopher Daggett
Vera King Farris, Kean College Vice President for Academic Affairs; third president of the Richard Stockton College of New Jersey, 1983-2003; former administrator at Kean, Stockton, the State University of New York at Stony Brook, the State University of New York at Brockport, and the University of Michigan; first African-American president of a New Jersey public college; New Jersey Woman of the Year in 1992; New Jersey Policymaker of the Year 1994
John Gerrish, composer (best known for The Falcon); professor of music at Kean University
Terry Golway, curator of the John T. Kean Center for American History at Kean University; author of several books on American and Irish history; former member of the New York Times editorial board
Michael Klein, art history professor at Kean (1996–1998); New York City art consultant and curator
Susan MacLaury, health professor; social worker; Emmy and Academy Award-winning producer
Frank X. McDermott, former trustee of Kean University; New Jersey delegate to the White House Conference on Education, 1955 (Dwight Eisenhower administration); member of the New Jersey General Assembly 1963-1967, 1975-1977 (assistant majority leader, 1965; minority leader, 1966); President of the New Jersey Senate and acting Governor of New Jersey, 1969; New Jersey Senator, 1967-1973 (Senate majority leader, 1968); Thomas Kean 1977 gubernatorial campaign chairman
Jim McGreevey, former Governor of New Jersey; former ethics professor at Kean University
Harold Norman Moldenke, former Kean professor; botanist; taxonomist
Marysa Navarro, historian 
Daniel O'Day, Jr., Vice President-Scholarships, Professor of English, Kean University
Richard O'Meara, retired Brigadier General in the United States Army; Vietnam War combat veteran; lawyer; member of the Judge Advocate General's Corps, U.S. Army; taught at Kean University, Rutgers University-Newark, Monmouth University, and the Division of Global Affairs
Ryan Spencer Reed, photojournalist; Kean University visiting artist lecturer
John J. Wooten, playwright, director, and producer; founding member and Producing Artistic Director of Premiere Stages at Kean University
Xiaobo Yu, Chinese palaeontologist and professor on biological sciences credited with first describing the lobe-finned fish Psarolepis romeri'', a transitional species between fish and amphibians
Raúl Zamudio, curator, art critic, art historian

Athletic coaches
Nick DiPillo, former assistant coach for the men's basketball team at Kean; assistant coach for the New York Liberty of the WNBA
Kirk Jellerson, Kean defensive coordinator, 2000–2002; head football coach at Utica College in Utica, New York and Whittier College in Whittier, California

Football coaches
John Allen, former head football coach for Kean College (1975–1976) and for Southwestern Assemblies of God University in Waxahachie, Texas
John Audino, former head football coach for Kean University, 1990–1991; head football coach for Union College in Schenectady, New York; Notre Dame University football player
Brian Carlson, Kean Cougars football head coach, 1992-1999
Charlie Cocuzza, Kean Cougars football head coach (2003–2005); former assistant coach at Montclair State
Ron San Filipo, Cougars head coach, 1973–1974; Kean Cougars baseball head coach, 1973-1975
Dan Garrett, Cougars head coach since 2006
Jim Hazlett, Cougars head coach, 1980–1986; Susquehanna University and Edinboro University of Pennsylvania
Glenn Hedden, Cougars head coach, 1987–1988; assistant football coach at Montclair State University
Drew Gibbs, Cougars head coach, 1989
Joe Loth, Cougars head coach, 2000–2002; 2009 guest coach for the Saskatchewan Roughriders; current head football coach for Otterbein College in Westerville, Ohio
Ray Murphy, Cougars head coach, 1977–1979
Hawley Waterman, first Cougars head coach, 1970-1971

References

People
Lists of people by university or college in New Jersey